Pamplin City is a town in Appomattox and Prince Edward counties in the U.S. state of Virginia. The population was 219 at the 2010 census.

The Appomattox County portion of Pamplin City is part of the Lynchburg Metropolitan Statistical Area.

History
Pamplin is the home of a Clay Pipe Factory, formerly the largest clay pipe factory in the United States. It is located to the side of Business 460.  It was listed on the National Register of Historic Places (NRHP) in 1980. The Buffalo Presbyterian Church was listed on the NRHP in 1995.

This town was a stop on the Southside Railroad in the mid-nineteenth Century.   This became the Atlantic, Mississippi and Ohio Railroad in 1870 and then a line in the Norfolk and Western Railway and now the Norfolk Southern Railway.  The rail line from Burkville to Pamplin City was converted by Virginia Department of Parks and Recreation into High Bridge Trail State Park.

The town has recently undergone a revitalization process. The Appomattox County library established an annex at the former Pamplin City Train Depot used by the Norfolk Southern Railroad. This renovated train depot now serves as a library and meeting place for the town; it is a center for holidays and other gatherings on special occasions.

Geography
Pamplin City is located at  (37.263523, -78.680985).

According to the United States Census Bureau, the town has a total area of 0.3 square miles (0.8 km2), all land.

Demographics

As of the census of 2000, there were 199 people, 78 households, and 51 families residing in the town. The population density was 653.5 people per square mile (256.1/km2). There were 89 housing units at an average density of 292.3 per square mile (114.5/km2). The racial makeup of the town was 90.95% White, 7.54% African American, and 1.51% from two or more races. Hispanic or Latino of any race were 1.51% of the population.

There were 78 households, out of which 34.6% had children under the age of 18 living with them, 44.9% were married couples living together, 14.1% had a female householder with no husband present, and 34.6% were non-families. 33.3% of all households were made up of individuals, and 21.8% had someone living alone who was 65 years of age or older. The average household size was 2.55 and the average family size was 3.27.

In the town, the population was spread out, with 31.2% under the age of 18, 7.5% from 18 to 24, 29.6% from 25 to 44, 12.6% from 45 to 64, and 19.1% who were 65 years of age or older. The median age was 34 years. For every 100 females there were 91.3 males. For every 100 females age 18 and over, there were 77.9 males.

The median income for a household in the town was $28,000, and the median income for a family was $36,250. Males had a median income of $23,125 versus $17,500 for females. The per capita income for the town was $15,246. About 16.7% of families and 19.0% of the population were below the poverty line, including 18.8% of those under the age of eighteen and 24.2% of those 65 or over.

References

Towns in Appomattox County, Virginia
Towns in Prince Edward County, Virginia